The following is a list of squads for each national team which competed at the 2020 AFC U-23 Championship. The tournament took place in Thailand, between 8–26 January 2020. It was the fourth U-23 age group competition organised by the Asian Football Confederation. As the tournament was not held during the FIFA International Match Calendar, clubs were not obligated to release the players.

The sixteen national teams involved in the tournament were required to register a squad of minimum 18 and maximum 23 players, minimum three of whom must be goalkeepers (Regulations Articles 24.1 and 24.2). Only players in these squads were eligible to take part in the tournament. Players born on or after 1 January 1997 were eligible to compete in the tournament. AFC published the final lists with squad numbers on their website on 2 January 2020.

The full squad listings are below. The age listed for each player is on 8 January 2020, the first day of the tournament. The nationality for each club reflects the national association (not the league) to which the club is affiliated. A flag is included for coaches who are of a different nationality than their own national team. Players in boldface have been capped at full international level at some point in their career.

Group A

Thailand 
Coach:  Akira Nishino

The preliminary squad was announced on 23 December 2019. The final squad was announced on 30 December 2019.

Iraq 
Coach: Abdul-Ghani Shahad

The final squad was announced on 1 January 2020.

Australia 
Coach: Graham Arnold

The final squad was announced on 30 December 2019. On 1 January 2020, it was announced that Daniel Margush replaced Tom Heward-Belle who was ruled out due to injury.

Bahrain 
Coach:  Samir Chammam

The final squad was announced on 28 December 2019.

Group B

Qatar 
Coach:  Félix Sánchez Bas

The preliminary squad was announced on 29 December 2019.

Japan 
Coach: Hajime Moriyasu

The final squad was announced on 29 December 2019.

Saudi Arabia 
Coach: Saad Al-Shehri

The preliminary squad was announced on 14 December 2019. The final squad was announced on 31 December 2019.

Syria 
Coach: Ayman Hakeem

The preliminary squad was announced on 28 December 2019. The final squad was announced on 31 December 2019.

Group C

Uzbekistan 
Coach:  Ljubinko Drulović

The preliminary squad was announced on 15 December 2019. The final squad was announced on 27 December 2019.

South Korea 
Coach: Kim Hak-bum

The preliminary squad was announced on 3 December 2019. The final squad was announced on 24 December 2019.

China PR 
Coach: Hao Wei

The preliminary squad was announced on 28 November 2019. The final squad was announced on 31 December 2019.

Iran 
Coach: Hamid Estili

The final squad was announced on 30 December 2019.

Group D

Vietnam 
Coach:  Park Hang-seo

The preliminary squad was announced on 12 December 2019. The final squad was announced on 6 January 2020.

North Korea 
Coach: Ri Yu-il

Jordan 
Coach: Ahmed Abdel-Qader

The final squad was announced on 20 December 2019.

United Arab Emirates 
Coach:  Maciej Skorża

The preliminary squad was announced on 31 December 2019.

References

2020 AFC U-23 Championship
AFC U-23 Championship squads